Albert Peter Smessaert (July 20, 1908 – November 22, 2000) was an American cyclist. He competed in the individual and team road race events at the 1928 Summer Olympics.

References

External links
 

1908 births
2000 deaths
American male cyclists
Olympic cyclists of the United States
Cyclists at the 1928 Summer Olympics
Place of birth missing
Belgian emigrants to the United States